Scala Regia is a term referring to a  number of majestic entrance staircases, including: 

 The Scala Regia of the Vatican, a flight of steps designed by Gian Lorenzo Bernini (1663–1666) to connect the Vatican Palace to St. Peter's Basilica.
 Main staircase of Villa Farnese at Caprarola
 Entrance to the Ducal Palace of Lucca
 Entrance to House of Lords, Westminster, United Kingdom

Other  staircase entrances include the Scala d'Oro in Venice.

Renaissance architecture
Baroque architectural features